The 1999 Bowling Green Falcons football team was an American football team that represented Bowling Green University in the Mid-American Conference (MAC) during the 1999 NCAA Division I-A football season. In their ninth season under head coach Gary Blackney, the Falcons compiled a 5–6 record (3–5 against MAC opponents), finished in fifth place in the MAC East Division, and were outscored by all opponents by a combined total of 312 to 296.

The team's statistical leaders included Ricky Schneider with 1,121 passing yards, Joe Alls with 592 rushing yards, and Kurt Gerling with 775 receiving yards.

Schedule

References

Bowling Green
Bowling Green Falcons football seasons
Bowling Green Falcons football